The National Council for Voluntary Organisations (NCVO) is the umbrella body for the voluntary and community sector in England. It is a registered charity (no 225922). NCVO works to support the voluntary and community sector and to create an environment in which an independent civil society can flourish. NCVO has a membership of more than 14,000 voluntary organisations. These range from large national bodies to community groups, volunteer centres, and development agencies working at a local level.

Location
NCVO's headquarters are in the King's Cross, London area at Society Building, 8 All Saints Street, London N1 9RL.

Aims
NCVO aims to:

 champion volunteering and the voluntary sector
 strengthen voluntary organisations
 grow and enhance volunteering, wherever it takes place
 connect people and organisations
 be a sustainable and socially responsible organisation

Activity
NCVO represents the views of its members, and the wider voluntary sector to government, the European Union and other bodies. It carries out research into, and analysis of, the voluntary and community sector. It campaigns on issues affecting the whole of the voluntary and community sector, such as the role of voluntary and community organisations in public service delivery and the future of local government. It provides information, advice and support to other organisations and individuals working in or with the voluntary and community sector.
Many now well-established voluntary organisations started out as projects within NCVO, including Age Concern, Citizens Advice, the Charities Aid Foundation, the Black Environment Network, the Youth Hostel Association and the National Federation of Young Farmers' Clubs.

In July 2019, NCVO's charity tax commission, chaired by Nicholas Montagu, issued a report calling for the overhaul of tax reliefs to UK charities.

History
NCVO started in 1919 as the National Council of Social Service (NCSS).  NCSS was established in order to bring various voluntary bodies together and into closer relationships with government departments. Its foundation was made possible through a legacy from Edward Vivian Birchall, who had played a large part in the emergent voluntary sector before he was killed, aged 32, in France during the First World War.

On 1 April 1980, just over 60 years since its foundation, the National Council of Social Service became the National Council for Voluntary Organisations.

On 1 January 2013, NCVO merged with Volunteering England (which itself had recently merged  with Student Volunteering England).

The organisation's first headquarters (from 1928 to 1992) were at 26 Bedford Square, London WC1.

Previous Presidents
1919–1921: The Rt Hon the Viscount Ullswater PC GCB
1921–1928: The Rt Hon J H Whitley PC MP
1928–1932: Captain The Rt Hon E A FitzRoy PC MP
1932–1935: The Rt Hon J H Whitley PC MP (second term)
1935–1938: The Rt Hon the Viscount Bledisloe PC GCMG KBE
1938–1939: The Rt Hon the Lord Snell PC CBE
1939–1951: Sir Percy Malcolm Stewart Bart DL OBE
1951–1954: The Rt Hon the Earl of Halifax PC KG OM GCSI GCIE
1954–1957: Sir Edward Peacock GCVO
1964–1969: The Rt Hon the Lord Hayworth
1969–1973: His Royal Highness the Duke of Edinburgh
1973–1981: Sir John Partridge KBE
1981–1986: Sir John Hedley Greenborough KBE
1986–1991: Sir Kenneth Durham
1991–1997: Sir Campbell Adamson
1997–2002: The Lord Plant of Highfield
2002–2007: The Baroness Rawlings
2007–2012: The Lord Hodgson
2012–2017: Baroness Grey-Thompson

Governance
NCVO's President, since November 2017, is Baroness Jill Pitkeathley.

Dr Priya Singh is NCVO's Chair.

In late January 2021, Karl Wilding, who had succeeded Sir Stuart Etherington as Chief Executive in 2020, was replaced by Sarah Vibert on an interim basis. Sarah Vibert was appointed on a permanent basis in March 2022. Etherington had succeeded Judy Weleminsky in 1994.

Sister organisations
The equivalent infrastructure bodies for voluntary organisations in the other UK countries are:

 Wales: WCVA, Wales Council for Voluntary Action
 Scotland: SCVO, the Scottish Council for Voluntary Organisations
 Northern Ireland: NICVA, the Northern Ireland Council for Voluntary Action

Controversy
On 5 February 2021, the magazine Third Sector published details of an independent external review of the organisation's culture. The review is reported to have foundFollowing the revelations, NCVO announced a series of new strategic decisions including the closing of its searchable database for fundraisers, Funding Central. Karl Wilding stepped down from the position of CEO in February 2021, citing the need for new leadership to bring about systemic cultural change at the organisation.

References

Further reading
 Coles, Kay (1993). National Council for Voluntary Organisations from 1919 to 1993: A Selective Summary of NCVO's Work and Origins, London: NCVO Publications. .

External links
 NCVO website
 

1919 establishments in England
Charities based in London
Kings Cross, London
Organisations based in the London Borough of Islington
Organizations established in 1919
Organizations established in 1980
Volunteer organisations in the United Kingdom